The Bowen River is a river located in North Queensland, Australia.

Course and features
Formed by the confluence of the Broken River and the Little Bowen River near Tent Hill in the Normanby Range, part of the Great Dividing Range, the Bowen River flows in a north-westerly direction along the base of the range then flows west across Emu Plains and is crossed by the Bowen Developmental Road just north of Havilah. The river descends  over its  course.

The catchment is in poor condition with much of the riparian habitat having been cleared and prone to erosion. The area is mostly used for cattle grazing with the towns of Collinsville and Glendon both drawing their town water supply from the Bowen River Weir.

The Bowen River Weir supplies water to a coal mine, power station and the township of Collinsville.

History

The river was named in 1861 by the Queensland Government, derived from the name of the town Bowen which was named in honour of Sir George Bowen, a  Governor of Queensland.

In the 1860s, Richard Daintree made mineral discoveries along the river. Daintree made the first systematic examination of the Bowen River coal seams near Collinsville.

Circa 1865, the Bowen River Hotel was built at the top of a steep bank of the river. The hotel is now listed on the Queensland Heritage Register.

Construction of the Bowen River Weir commenced in April 1982 and was completed in August 1983.

See also

References

External links

Rivers of Queensland
North Queensland